Cheaper Thrills is a live album by Big Brother and the Holding Company with Janis Joplin as their lead singer.  Recorded live at one of their earliest concerts in San Francisco at California Hall on July 28, 1966, it includes the band's rendition of the song "Let the Good Times Roll," which was ten years old at the time. The recording of this concert became officially available to the public for the first time in 1984. The LP was originally released by Rhino Records as RNLP 121. Big Brother drummer David Getz produced and contributed liner notes to the back cover with his personal reminiscences of the circumstances leading to the formation and success of the band.

The live material on this release was also released as Cheaper Thrills, 1984, Edsel Records (UK), and
Live in San Francisco 1966, 2002, Varese.

The CD versions' track listing are in a different order, with the Varese version adding the bonus track, "Hall of the Mountain King."

Track listing

Personnel
Big Brother and the Holding Company
 Janis Joplin - vocals, maracas
 James Gurley - guitar
 Sam Andrew – guitar
 Peter Albin – bass, vocals
 David Getz - drums
Technical
 Dana Joe Chappelle - engineer
 Skip Saylor - engineer
 Stanley Mouse - front cover art, calligraphy
 Herb Greene ~ front cover photograph

References

1984 live albums
Big Brother and the Holding Company albums